Gustav Friedrich Beyer (von Beyer since 1859; born 26 February 1812 in Berlin; died 7 December 1889 in Leipzig) was a Prussian general and war minister of the Grand Duchy of Baden.

Biography

Beyer was the son of a Prussian government official (Privy Councilor). He was also the older brother of the future mayor of Potsdam, . He joined the Prussian Army in April 1829. From 1835 to 1838 he attended the General War School as a second lieutenant, and in 1846 was promoted to first lieutenant; taking part in the suppression of the Baden Revolution in 1849.

Orders and decorations
 : Knight of the Royal Guelphic Order, 1858
 : Commander of the Grand Ducal Hessian Order of Ludwig, 2nd Class, 22 October 1861
  Kingdom of Prussia:
 Knight of the Order of the Red Eagle, 2nd Class with Star, Oak Leaves and Swords, 1866; Grand Cross with Swords on Ring, 9 July 1875
 Iron Cross (1870), 1st Class
 Grand Commander's Cross of the Royal House Order of Hohenzollern, with Star, 11 December 1880
 Service Award Cross
 :
 Grand Cross of the Order of the Zähringer Lion, 1868; with Swords and Golden Collar, 1879
 Commander of the Military Karl-Friedrich Merit Order, 1870
 Service Cross, 1st Class
 :
 Knight of the Imperial Order of Saint Anna, 2nd Class
 Knight of the Imperial Order of Saint Stanislaus, 2nd Class

Literature
 L. Löhlein: Gustav Friedrich v. Beyer. In: Friedrich von Weech (Ed.): Badische Biographien . First Part, Heidelberg 1875, pp. 82–83 (online in the Baden State Library) .
 Gustav Friedrich von Beyer. (To Part I, p. 82 ff.) In: Friedrich von Weech (Ed.): Badische Biographien. Fourth Part, Karlsruhe 1891, p. 524 (online in the Baden State Library) .
 Kurt von Priesdorff : Soldier leadership . Volume 7, Hanseatische Verlagsanstalt Hamburg, undated [Hamburg], undated [1939], DNB 367632829, pp. 330–332, no. 2320.
 Wolfgang Schütz: Koblenz heads. People from the city's history - namesake for streets and squares. 2. revised and exp. Edition. Publishing house for advertising papers, Mülheim-Kärlich 2005.

References

Generals of Infantry (Prussia)
1812 births
1889 deaths
Prussian people of the Austro-Prussian War
Military personnel of the Grand Duchy of Baden
German military personnel of the Franco-Prussian War
Recipients of the Iron Cross (1870), 1st class
Military personnel from Berlin